Keith Leslie Pratt (born 27 January 1938) is a British academic, author, historian, Koreanist, Sinologist and professor emeritus in the Department of East Asian Studies at Durham University in the United Kingdom.

Pratt is the author or coauthor of numerous books and articles on Korea, including Korea: A Historical and Cultural Dictionary.

Selected work
Pratt's published writings encompass 53 works in 76 publications in 3 languages and 2,174 library holdings.

 2006 — Everlasting Flower: a History of Korea
 1999 — Korea: a Historical and Cultural Dictionary
 1995 — Korean Painting
 1970 — Visitors to China; Eyewitness Accounts of Chinese History

Honours 
 Korea Foundation, 2002.
 British Association for Korean Studies, secretary,  2010.

Notes

Living people
1938 births
Koreanists
British sinologists
British orientalists
20th-century British male writers
20th-century British historians
21st-century British male writers
21st-century British historians
British male non-fiction writers
Academics of Durham University